The Social Democracy of America (SDA), later known as the Cooperative Brotherhood, was a short lived political party in the United States that sought to combine the planting of an intentional community with political action in order to create a socialist society. It was an organizational forerunner of both the Socialist Party of America (SPA) and the Burley, Washington cooperative socialist colony.

The party split into political and colonization wings at its convention in 1898, with the political actionists establishing themselves as the Social Democratic Party of America (SDP).

Organizational history

Formation 

After being jailed in the aftermath of the 1894 Pullman Strike, Eugene V. Debs became interested in socialist ideas. Despite supporting William Jennings Bryan in the 1896 presidential race, Debs announced his conversion to socialism in January 1897. In June of that year, he held a convention of his American Railway Union (ARU) in Chicago, where it was decided to merge the ARU with a faction of the Brotherhood of the Cooperative Commonwealth (BCC) and other elements to create a new organization, the Social Democracy of America. The newspaper of the ARU, Railway Times, was retitled to become official organ of the new organization, The Social Democrat. The convention establishing the SDA was opened on June 15, 1897 in Uhlich's Hall in Chicago—the former headquarters of the ATU during the Pullman strike. The session was attended by 118 delegates, predominately from the Midwest and the Western United States. The keynote address to the convention was delivered by Gene Debs.

Among the elements that joined in forming the new party was a faction of independent Midwestern socialists centered around Victor Berger. This mainly German American group kept up a loosely organized Social Democratisher Verein and published the oldest socialist daily in the country, the Milwaukee Vorwarts. This tendency emphasized electoral socialism, especially in local politics, in order to appeal to workers on issues of immediate, day-to-day importance. Prominent American adherents to this faction included Seymour Stedman and Frederic Heath.

While the SDA was being organized, there was some factional trouble within the older Socialist Labor Party (SLP). Some elements within the SLPs Jewish membership, concentrated in Manhattans Lower East Side, had objected to the party's dual unionism policy. As a consequence, the party's Yiddish language papers—the Dos Abend Blatt and Arbeter-Zeitung—were put under direct party control. When the dissidents responded by launching The Jewish Daily Forward and forming Press Clubs to influence party activity among Jewish members, the party leadership expelled the fourth, fifth and twelfth assembly district branches on July 4. The expelled branches held a convention July 31 to August 2, at which they decided to affiliate with the SDA. Among the prominent members of this faction were Abraham Cahan, Meyer London, Isaac Hourwich, Morris Winchevsky, Michael Zametkin, Max Pine and Louis E. Miller.

In St. Louis, the local SLP branch had published its own paper Labor in the early to mid-nineties, edited by Albert Sanderson and Gustav Hoehn, which showed independence from the SLP leadership and also opposed the dual union policy. This paper's editorial policy was condemned and the paper disaffiliated with the party at its 1896 convention, but ill feeling toward the party leadership continued. In January 1897, the St. Louis local readmitted a member named Priestbach into the party after he had left in 1896 to work for William Jennings Bryan's campaign. The vote for readmittance was 28 to 24 in Priesterbachs favor, which was less than the two thirds prescribed by the SLP constitution. On petition of loyal members the St. Louis local was reorganized and the dissident members went into the new SDA. This contingent was bolstered in August 1897 when the SDA was joined by the remnants of the Social Democratic Federation (SDF), a predominantly German-language group headed by Wilhelm Rosenberg which had split off the SLP in 1889. From the very beginning there were divisions in the group between those who saw its main purpose as winning office and introducing socialistic legislation and those influenced by the BCC idea of trying to "socialize" a Western state by planting socialist colonies there and eventually taking over its government. Nevertheless, a three-man colonization commission criss crossed the country visiting possible sites, especially in Colorado and Tennessee.

Development 

The SDA began as a Chicago-centric organization. According to the published statement of Secretary Sylvester Keliher, during the organization's first month of existence there were 50 branches established, of which 11 were located in the city of Chicago. Keliher also indicated that more than 300 applications for the establishment of new branches had been received in the same period, of which 20 were located in this urban center of the midwest. Keliher also stated that there were another 75 local lodges of the ARU which voted to join the SDA en bloc.

By the time of the SDA's convention on June 7, 1898, there was already a great deal of tension between the colonizationists and political actionists, the latter group accusing the former of trying to "pack" the convention with delegates from recently formed "paper branches" in the Chicago area. The divisions came to a head on June 10, when the convention heard the reports of its platform committee. The majority report, presented by Victor Berger and Margaret Haile, recommended the abandonment of the colonization scheme.

The minority report written by John F. Lloyd, but read to the convention by J.S. Ingalls, favored the two pronged approach adopted a year earlier. The platform question caused long and bitter debate, lasting until 2 am the next morning when a roll call vote showed 53 for the colonization platform and 37 against. With the defeat of the political action platform, Isaac Hourwich led a walk out of the minority to Revere House across the street, where the dissidents founded the Social Democratic Party of America (SDPA), which in 1901 would merge with other groups to become the Socialist Party of America.

Cooperative Brotherhood 
The majority attempted to carry out their colonization scheme and they published three more issues of the Social Democrat, but financial difficulties made them halt the fourth issue while in type. Fearing that the organization might go under if a colony was not established immediately, they authorized Cyrus Field Willard to locate a colony and "do what in his judgment appeared the right thing to do". Willard went to Seattle to consult with SDA member J.B. Fowler, who pointed out the good harbors on southern Puget Sound, where they found Henry W. Stein, who was sympathetic to them politically and had just become the executor of some land in rural Kitsap County that was open for sale. 

In September 1898, the SDA re-incorporated in Seattle as the Cooperative Brotherhood and on October 18 they purchased  for $6,000. The first colonists arrived on October 20, 1898. A new organizational structure was put into place, with members paying a $1 initiation fee and $1 monthly dues—the intention being that such substantial dues would provide a constant monthly income to subsidize the initial phase of the colonization effort. In addition, a rather far-fetched prospectus was issued, proposing the generation of $5 million in operating capital though the sale of $10 shares of non-dividend paying stock, with additional funds raised through sale of low-interest bonds to supporters. National headquarters were established in Seattle.

While never reaching more than about 120 inhabitants, the colony thrived for a few years. Originally named Brotherhood, the inhabitants gradually began to refer to it as Burley after the nearby Burley creek. A colony scrip was created that included a $1 denomination for an eight-hour work day and smaller units, called minims, for minutes worker over or less than six hours.

Circle City was the informal name of a group of buildings near the water. The colony subsisted on agriculture, fishing and logging. They also made income selling cigars, jam, subscriptions of its magazines and membership in the B.C. It also rented out use of its mill, and rooms in its Commonwealth Hotel for visitors.

Colonization Commission Secretary Willard, who initially led the Washington colonization effort, departed in 1899 to join a Theosophist colony in Point Loma, California. The Brotherhood was later governed by a twelve-man board of trustees who were elected by mail vote each December for four year staggered terms. A board of directors managed the affairs of the colony itself, and was elected every January. Members of the Cooperative Brotherhood who were not residents of the colony organized in local chapters called Temples of the Knights of the Brotherhood in places like Chicago.

Its newspaper, the Co-operator, stayed in publication from December 1898 to June 1906. Originally an eight-page weekly, it changed to a 32-page monthly in 1902 and to a 16-page magazine in October 1903.

The colony went into decline in the late 1900s. In December 1904, some members re-incorporated into the Burley Rochdale Mercantile Association and three months later the Cooperative Brotherhood itself re-organized into a joint stock company. By 1908, there were 150 members of the Brotherhood, only 17 resident of the colony. The trustees called a meeting of stockholders to dissolve the Brotherhood in late 1912, but it lacked the two-thirds majority, whereupon those who were in favor of disbanding took the company to court. On January 10, 1913, Judge John P. Young ordered the Cooperative Brotherhood dissolved and put its assets into receivership. The last of its properties were sold off in 1924.

Prominent members 

 Victor L. Berger
 W. P. Borland
 Abraham Cahan
 James F. Carey
 Jesse Cox
 Eugene V. Debs
 Theodore Debs
 Alfred S. Edwards
 Paul Grottkau
 Richard J. Hinton
 G. A. Hoehn
 Isaac Hourwich
 Sylvester Keliher
 Margaret Haile
 Frederic Heath
 James Hogan
 Meyer London
 William Mailly
 Louis E. Miller
 Lucy Parsons
 Max Pine
 Seymour Stedman
 Cyrus Field Willard
 Morris Winchevsky
 Michael Zametkin

See also 
 Brotherhood of the Cooperative Commonwealth
 Socialist Party of Washington

Footnotes

Sources

Publications 
 Merrie England. Social Democracy Library. No. 1. Chicago. Social Democracy of America. 1897.
 Three in One: A Trinity of Arguments on Socialism. Social Democracy Library. No. 2. Chicago. The Social Democracy. 1898.
 Cyrus Field Willard, Security of Employment. Chicago: Social Democracy of America, June 1898.

Further reading 
 Bernard J. Brommel. "Debs's Cooperative Commonwealth Plan for Workers". Labor History. vol. 1., no. 4 (Fall 1971). pp. 560–569.

External links 
 Socialist Party history. Early American Marxism website.

Political parties established in 1897
Utopian communities in the United States
Defunct social democratic parties in the United States
Defunct socialist parties in the United States
Organizations based in Chicago
Politically motivated migrations
Socialist Party of America
Eugene V. Debs
Political parties in Washington (state)
Political history of Washington (state)
Kitsap County, Washington
State and local socialist parties in the United States